Alan Brown (23 March 1926 – 7 September 1979), known professionally as Alan Browning, was an English actor. He is best remembered for portraying Alan Howard in the television series Coronation Street, a role he played from 1969 to 1973. He was married to his Coronation Street co-star Pat Phoenix from 23 December 1972, until his 1979 death from liver failure as a result of his heavy alcohol intake. Phoenix played his onscreen wife, Elsie Tanner, in Coronation Street.

Browning's other television appearances included The Plane Makers (1964), The Newcomers (1965), The War of Darkie Pilbeam (1968), two episodes of The Avengers ("Intercrime" in 1963 and "Who Was That Man I Saw You With?" in 1969) and Big Breadwinner Hog (1969) and a regular role in The Cedar Tree (1976-77).

His film credits included Feet of Clay (1960), Fury at Smugglers' Bay (1961), Cleopatra (1963), Guns at Batasi (1964), and Julius Caesar (1970). His final credit was in a 1978 episode of Return of the Saint.

Filmography

References

External links

Alan Browning at Corrie.net

1926 births
1979 deaths
People from Sunderland
Male actors from Tyne and Wear
Actors from County Durham
English male film actors
English male soap opera actors
20th-century English male actors